Jens Henrik Tönjum (born 17 May 1995) is a Swedish-born Norwegian professional ice hockey winger.

References

External links
 

1995 births
Frederikshavn White Hawks players
IF Sundsvall Hockey players
IK Oskarshamn players
Living people
Malmö Redhawks players
Norwegian ice hockey players
Sparta Warriors players
Swedish ice hockey left wingers